The 2011 Nigerian Senate election in Bayelsa State was held on April 9, 2011, to elect members of the Nigerian Senate to represent Bayelsa State. Clever Ikisikpo representing Bayelsa East, Emmanuel Paulker representing Bayelsa Central and Heineken Lokpobiri representing Bayelsa West all won on the platform of Peoples Democratic Party.

Overview

Summary

Results

Bayelsa East 
Peoples Democratic Party candidate Clever Ikisikpo won the election, defeating other party candidates.

Bayelsa Central 
Peoples Democratic Party candidate Emmanuel Paulker won the election, defeating other party candidates.

Bayelsa West 
Peoples Democratic Party candidate Heineken Lokpobiri won the election, defeating party candidates.

References 

Bayelsa State senatorial elections
senatorial
Bayelsa State Senate elections